The Ethiopian amphibious rat also known as the Ethiopian water mouse (Nilopegamys plumbeus) is an insectivorous and semiaquatic species of rodent in the monotypic genus Nilopegamys of the family Muridae. There has only been one known specimen. It was found along the Lesser Abay River near its source at an altitude of 2600 m in the highlands of northwestern Ethiopia in 1928. N. plumbeus is considered to be the most aquatically adapted African murid; its unusually large brain is thought to be one consequence of this lifestyle. The species is considered to be critically endangered or possibly extinct, since its habitat has been severely damaged by overgrazing and monoculture.

Distribution and discovery
In late March of 1928 the Ethiopian amphibious rat was cataloged for the first time. The specimen was discovered in a trap set by Wilfred H. Osgood, and was unlike any African rat he had seen before. The rat showed multiple adaptations to aquatic life which is uncommon for rats in Africa. Aquatic rats have been observed in South America but never before in east Africa.

The Ethiopian amphibious rat has been spotted very few times in the wild. It has been sighted in the Ethiopian highlands in their wetland areas. The single found specimen was located near the Lesser Abay River in central Ethiopia. This rat is listed as critically endangered but many researchers studying the rodent fear it is already extinct due to two failed attempts to locate and track the rat.

Anatomy
Nilopegamuys plumbeus is specifically adapted to live near or in close contact with water. There are other rodents adapted to live in wetlands such as marsh rice rat or the European water vole. Out of all other African aquatic rodents however, the Ethiopian amphibious rat has the most extreme adaptations to its environment. They have a pair of adapted “waders” on their feet recognizable as webbing. Since N. plumbeus is so specifically adapted to its environment it makes living elsewhere very difficult. This is why scientists think that with the degradation of its habitat, N. plumbeus is now likely extinct.

The rat belongs to the family Muridae and has the largest cranial capacity of any African muroid ever sampled. They also have very large brains compared to their body size and given the average brain size of aquatic rodents.

Status

Threats 
The main reason for the population decline of the Ethiopian amphibious rat is habitat loss. Although not much research has been done on the preexisting population size of this rat species, it can be said the population has declined drastically with the destruction of its habitat. The leading cause for the destruction of Ethiopian highland, wetlands is loss to livestock grazing. Their habitat is almost completely destroyed due to this clearing for grazing and there is little being done to protect it. Ranching has also contributed to this habitat loss but not to the same scale.

Conservation & further knowledge
At the time there is not much in place in terms of conservation for the Ethiopian amphibious rat. They are considered critically endangered by the IUCN red list and even possibly extinct. There is also very little research that has been done on this species. Currently, East African highland small mammals are being studied by Julian Kerbis Peterhans at the Field Museum in Chicago Illinois, USA. Almost all that is known about this species is taken from a single study that was conducted in the 1920s. More research about this species, its habits, and its environment are needed.

References

Ethiopian water mouse | SMSG - Small Mammal Specialist Group
Mammal Species of the World - Browse: plumbeus
The Ethiopian water mouse Nilopegamys Osgood, with comments on semi-aquatic adaptations in African Muridae
Scientific Illustration

Endemic fauna of Ethiopia
Old World rats and mice
Mammals of Ethiopia
Mammals described in 1928
Taxonomy articles created by Polbot